The 1950 Illinois Fighting Illini football team was an American football team that represented the University of Illinois during the 1950 Big Nine Conference football season.  In their ninth year under head coach Ray Eliot, the Illini compiled a 7–2 record, finished in fourth place in the Big Ten Conference, and were ranked #13 in the final AP Poll. The lone setbacks were losses Wisconsin and Northwestern. End Tony Klimek was selected as the team's most valuable player.

Schedule

Players
 Charles E. "Chuck" Brown - guard (1st-team All-Big Ten pick by AP and UP)
 Johnny Karras - halfback (2nd-team All-Big Ten pick by AP and UP)
 Tony Klimek - end (1st-team All-Big Ten pick by AP and UP)
 Lynn Lynch - guard (2nd-team All-Big Ten pick by AP and UP)
 Dick Raklovits - halfback (1st-team All-Big Ten pick by AP and UP)
 Al Tate - tackle (1st-team All-America pick by Football Writers; 2nd-team All-Big Ten pick by AP and UP)
 Bill Vohaska - center (1st-team All-America pick by AP; 1st-team All-Big Ten pick by AP and UP)

References

Illinois
Illinois Fighting Illini football seasons
Illinois Fighting Illini football